Lewis County is a county located in the U.S. state of New York. As of the 2020 census, the population was 26,582, making it the fourth-least populous county in New York. Its county seat is Lowville. The county is named after Morgan Lewis, the Governor of New York when the county was established.

History
The area now occupied by Lewis County was very sparsely occupied until the end of the 18th century.  Although the land was already claimed by the Province of New York in its original grant, the land was clearly part of the territory of the Iroquois confederacy until after the American Revolutionary War, when New York seized the lands from tribes that had supported the British. The lands were unsurveyed and remained unattractive to settlement until after the complex process of Macomb's Purchase of 1791 eventually put much of the land in the hands of John Brown.

Jurisdiction history
The area now falling in the jurisdiction of Lewis County, New York, has changed jurisdiction many times, beginning as part of the originally enormous Albany County in 1683, then, after one of the many times that Albany County was divided, becoming part of Tryon County in 1772, which was renamed to Montgomery County in 1784; next, present-day Lewis County was part of Herkimer County in 1791, then part of Oneida County in 1798, and finally assumed its current name and borders in 1805.

When counties were established in New York State in 1683, the present Lewis County was part of Albany County. This was an enormous county, including the northern part of New York State as well as all of the present State of Vermont and, in theory, extending westward to the Pacific Ocean. This county was reduced in size on July 3, 1766, by the creation of Cumberland County, and further on March 16, 1770, by the creation of Gloucester County, both containing territory now in Vermont.

On March 12, 1772, what was left of Albany County was split into three parts, one remaining under the name Albany County. One of the other pieces, Tryon County, contained the western portion (and thus, since no western boundary was specified, theoretically still extended west to the Pacific). The eastern boundary of Tryon County was approximately five miles west of the present city of Schenectady, and the county included the western part of the Adirondack Mountains and the area west of the West Branch of the Delaware River. The area then designated as Tryon County now includes 37 counties of New York State. The county was named for William Tryon, colonial governor of New York.

In the years prior to 1776, most of the Loyalists in Tryon County fled to Canada. In 1784, following the peace treaty that ended the American Revolutionary War, the name of Tryon County was changed to Montgomery County to honor the general, Richard Montgomery, who had captured several places in Canada and died attempting to capture the city of Quebec, replacing the name of the hated British governor.

In 1789, the size of Montgomery County was reduced by the splitting off of Ontario County from Montgomery. The actual area split off from Montgomery County was much larger than the present county, also including the present Allegany, Cattaraugus, Chautauqua, Erie, Genesee, Livingston, Monroe, Niagara, Orleans, Steuben, Wyoming, Yates, and part of Schuyler and Wayne Counties.

In 1791, Herkimer County was one of three counties split off from Montgomery (the other two being Otsego, and Tioga County). This was much larger than the present county, however, and was reduced by a number of subsequent splits. The first one of these, in 1794, produced Onondaga County. This county was larger than the current Onondaga County, including the present Cayuga, Cortland, and part of Oswego Counties.

Oneida County (as well as a part of Chenango County), was split off from Herkimer County in 1798.

Lewis County was split off from Oneida County in 1805.

Lewis County, once organized, adopted five towns; Leyden, Turin, Martinsburg, Lowville, and Harrisburg. Today there are seventeen and they are Croghan, Denmark, Diana, Greig, Harrisburg, Highmarket, Lewis, Leyden, Lowville, Martinsburg, Montague, New Bremen, Osceola, Pinckney, Turin, Watson, and West Turin. Croghan was adopted in 1841, Denmark was in 1807, Diana in 1830, Greig 1828, Harrisburg 1803, Highmarket 1852, Lewis 1852, Leyden 1797, Lowville 1800, Martinsburg 1803, Montague 1850, New Bremen 1848, Osceola 1844, Pinckney 1808, Turin 1800, Watson 1821, and West Turin in 1830. These towns were adopted in a very short time span of about 55 years.

Military history
On April 11, 1805, the Militia of Lewis, Jefferson and St Lawrence was established by the Council of Appointment under General Walter Martin. This was known as the 26th Brigade, aka Martin's Brigade.

350 men of the 26th Brigade were detached but never deployed in response to an Act of Congress dated 30 Mar 1808, in response to the English troubles.

On June 15, 1808, the 1st Regiment was established under Lieutenant Luke Winchell, consisting of troops from Lowville, Denmark, Harrisburg and Pinckney. A cavalry troop was formed in 1809 under Captain Levi Collins.

On April 10, 1812, in anticipation of war, the President of the United States was authorized to call up men for military service. To that end, a company was drafted for three months, under Captain Lyman Deming, of Denmark, in the regiment of Colonel Christopher P. Bellinger, of German Flats. They served at Sackett's Harbor from May 12, 1812, to August 21, 1812, when they were discharged.

When the War of 1812 began on June 12, 1812, the above company was in the field, participating in the First Battle of Sacket's Harbor. To supply them, a company of 72 men were called up on June 23, 1812, under Captain Nathan Cook and placed under Colonel Thomas B Benedict of DeKalb.

County wide drafts were issued in March 1813, September 1813, July 1814 and October 1814 in support of the war effort.

Geography

Lewis County is located in northwestern New York State, slightly east of due north from Syracuse.  The eastern part of the county is in the Adirondack Park.  A good portion of the Tug Hill Plateau is in the western part of the county.  The county is home to the Black River Valley.

Adjacent counties
 St. Lawrence County - north
 Herkimer County - east
 Oneida County - south
 Oswego County - west
 Jefferson County - northwest

Transportation 
Major Routes include:

 NY-3
 NY-12
 NY-12D
 NY-26
 NY-812

Demographics 

As of the census of 2000, there were 26,944 people, 10,040 households, and 7,309 families residing in the county. The racial makeup of the county was 98.17% White, 0.39% African American, 0.28% Native American, 0.23% Asian, 0.05% Pacific Islander, 0.28% from other races, and 0.59% from two or more races. Hispanic or Latino of any race were 0.64% of the population. 28.8% were of German, 13.8% French, 13.1% Irish, 9.2% English, 6.5% American and 5.3% Polish ancestry according to Census 2000. 97.3% spoke English and 1.0% Spanish as their first language.

There were 10,040 households, out of which 35.30% had children under the age of 18 living with them, 59.40% were married couples living together, 8.40% had a female householder with no husband present, and 27.20% were non-families. 22.60% of all households were made up of individuals, and 10.80% had someone living alone who was 65 years of age or older.  The average household size was 2.66 and the average family size was 3.12.

In the county, the population was spread out, with 27.80% under the age of 18, 7.70% from 18 to 24, 28.20% from 25 to 44, 22.50% from 45 to 64, and 13.80% who were 65 years of age or older.  The median age was 37 years. For every 100 females there were 98.60 males.  For every 100 females age 18 and over, there were 97.60 males.

The median income for a household in the county was $34,361, and the median income for a family was $39,287. Males had a median income of $30,479 versus $21,115 for females. The per capita income for the county was $14,971.  About 10.10% of families and 13.20% of the population were below the poverty line, including 16.40% of those under age 18 and 14.00% of those age 65 or over.

2020 Census

Communities

Larger Settlements

† - County Seat

†† - Former Village

Towns

 Croghan
 Denmark
 Diana
 Greig
 Harrisburg
 Lewis
 Leyden
 Lowville
 Lyonsdale
 Martinsburg
 Montague
 New Bremen
 Osceola
 Pinckney
 Turin
 Watson
 West Turin

Hamlets
 Beaver Falls
 Talcottville
 List of other hamlets

Notable people

Child actor and veterinarian Peter Ostrum (born November 1957) settled in Lowville, Lewis County to practice veterinary medicine.

Judge Fred A. Young (August 27, 1904 – October 16, 1973) was a prominent Republican politician, lawyer, state legislator, and state judge, who was born in, and lived most of his life in, Lowville.

Florence Augusta Merriam Bailey (August 8, 1863 – September 22, 1948) was an American ornithologist and nature writer. She was born in Locust Grove, New York. The third child in her family, she was the younger sister of Clinton Hart Merriam. Florence Augusta Merriam Bailey was born in Locust Grove, New York. Bailey grew up at her family's estate, "Homewood", in the town of Leyden, whose fields and forests in the Black River Valley between the Tug Hill Plateau and Adirondack Mountains provided an ideal environment for the study of natural history. She was encouraged in her interest in nature by her brother as well as her father. Her father was interested in scientific matters and was in correspondence with John Muir after meeting him at Yosemite in the summer of 1871. Born during the Civil War, Florence devoted her life to the study and protection of birds. From her work in ornithology she authored over ten books, including several field guides to birds, and close to one hundred articles. Though interested in birds as a child, she gained recognition as a naturalist while at Smith College. Disgusted by the use of feathers and whole birds in fashion, she started the Smith College Audubon Society.

Franklin B. Hough (July 20, 1822 – June 11, 1885) was a scientist, historian and the first chief of the United States Division of Forestry, the predecessor of the United States Forest Service. He was among the first to call attention to the depletion of forests in the U.S. and is sometimes called the "father of American forestry". He was born in Martinsburg and retired in Lowville.

Clinton Hart Merriam (December 5, 1855 – March 19, 1942) was an American zoologist, ornithologist, entomologist, ethnographer, and naturalist. In 1886, he became the first chief of the Division of Economic Ornithology and Mammalogy of the United States Department of Agriculture, predecessor to the National Wildlife Research Center and the United States Fish and Wildlife Service. In 1883, he was a founding member of the American Ornithologists' Union. He was one of the original founders of the National Geographic Society in 1888. He developed the concept of "life zones" to classify biomes found in North America along an altitudinal sequence corresponding to the zonal latitudinal sequence from Equator to Pole. In mammalogy, he is known as an excessive splitter, proposing, for example, tens of different species of North American brown bears in several genera. Later in life, funded by the Harriman family, Merriam's focus shifted to studying and assisting the Native American tribes in the western United States. His contributions on the myths of central California and on ethnogeography were particularly noteworthy.

Edward McGlachlin (December 19. 1840 - April 22, 1931) was an American newspaper editor and politician. McGlachlin was born in Watson.

Politics

|}

See also

 List of counties in New York
 National Register of Historic Places listings in Lewis County, New York
 Castorland Company

Bibliography
 Hough, Franklin B. 1822-1885 A history of Lewis County, in the State of New York, from the beginning of its settlement to the present time. Merrick, New York :Richwood Publishing Company.

References

Further reading

External links

 Lewis County website
 
 Early history notes of Lewis County
 Early history summary of Lewis County

 
1805 establishments in New York (state)
Populated places established in 1805